Andemen station, is a transfer station of Line 1 and Line 10 of the Nanjing Metro.

The station is located in Nanjing's Yuhuatai District; the Line 1 station is situated between Xiaohang Road to the west and Andemen Street to the east, while the Line 10 station is situated along the latter thoroughfare.

Station structure

Line 1

Line 10

References

Railway stations in Jiangsu
Railway stations in China opened in 2005
Nanjing Metro stations